Negreanu is a surname. Notable people with the surname include:

Daniel Negreanu (born 1974), Canadian poker player 
Dinu Negreanu (1917–2001), Romanian film director

Romanian-language surnames